Conocrinus is a genus of sea lilies in the family Bourguticrinidae, containing 6 species.

Species

 Conocrinus cabiochi Roux, 1976
 Conocrinus cherbonnieri Roux, 1976
 Conocrinus globularis (Gislén, 1925)
 Conocrinus lofotensis (Sars, 1868)
 Conocrinus minimus (Döderlein, 1907)
 Conocrinus poculum (Döderlein, 1907)

References

Bourgueticrinida
Crinoid genera